Richard Layton (1815 – 21 March 1893) was an organist and composer based in Stamford, Lincolnshire.

Life

He was born in Peterborough in 1815, the son of Richard Layton (1786 - 1874), the Sexton of Peterborough Cathedral, and Martha Frisby. He was baptised on 26 March 1815.

He was a dealer in musical instruments based in Stamford, Lincolnshire.

He died on 21 March 1893 and left £633 15s to his wife, Eliza.

Appointments

Organist of St Martin's Church, Stamford 1836 - ca. 1876
Organist of St Mary's Church, Stamford 
Organist of St George's Church, Stamford ca. 1878

Works

He wrote 
Hark the brazen trumpet sounds. 1841
The Rosy Morn. 1843
Star of Hope Polka 
Song of the Snow (words by S.L. Moore). 1873.
Old Lindum Polka.

References

1815 births
1893 deaths
English organists
British male organists
English composers
19th-century British composers
19th-century English musicians
19th-century British male musicians
19th-century organists